Slaviša Mitrović (Славиша Митровић; born July 5, 1977) is a retired Bosnian-Herzegovinian Serb footballer.

Club career
A big forward, Mitrović played in the UAE League with Alahli and Al-Wahda (UAE) and in Romanian League with Național București and in the Second Division with SC Concordia Chiajna. He was the second top scorer with Alahli in UAE League with 19 goals.

References

External links
  
 
 

1977 births
Living people
People from Visoko
Serbs of Bosnia and Herzegovina
Association football forwards
Bosnia and Herzegovina footballers
OFK Bečej 1918 players
Nyíregyháza Spartacus FC players
FC Progresul București players
Suwon Samsung Bluewings players
Al Ahli Club (Dubai) players
Al Wahda FC players
Al-Wakrah SC players
CS Concordia Chiajna players
Nemzeti Bajnokság II players
Liga I players
K League 1 players
UAE Pro League players
Qatar Stars League players
Liga II players
Bosnia and Herzegovina expatriate footballers
Expatriate footballers in Hungary
Bosnia and Herzegovina expatriate sportspeople in Hungary
Expatriate footballers in Serbia and Montenegro
Bosnia and Herzegovina expatriate sportspeople in Serbia and Montenegro
Expatriate footballers in Romania
Bosnia and Herzegovina expatriate sportspeople in Romania
Expatriate footballers in South Korea
Bosnia and Herzegovina expatriate sportspeople in South Korea
Expatriate footballers in the United Arab Emirates
Bosnia and Herzegovina expatriate sportspeople in the United Arab Emirates
Expatriate footballers in Qatar
Bosnia and Herzegovina expatriate sportspeople in Qatar